"Amoureux solitaires" is a song by the Belgian pop singer Lio. It was released in 1980 on Ariola Records and Arabella Records as the second single and as well as the sixth track from her debut self-titled album. It is a bubblegum pop song that was written by Elli Medeiros and Jacno and produced by the latter.
It also reached the  1 slot on the Italian charts for two weeks.

Track listing
 "Amoureux solitaires"
 "La petite amazone"

Charts

Weekly charts

Year-end charts

Cover versions
 Recorded by Kim Kay on her 1998 album La vie en lilali.

References

External links
 
 
 
 
 

1980 singles
1980 songs
Lio songs
Ariola Records singles